K-1 World Grand Prix, also known as the K-1 World GP, is an elimination kickboxing tournament that has been held annually since 1993 by the K-1 organization. Each year, K-1 holds various 16-men, 8-match grand prix style tournaments throughout the world to determine which 16 fighters will compete in the K-1 World GP. This tournament has had nine different winners with Ernesto Hoost and Semmy Schilt each winning four times.

Match-ups

Usually combatants of the quarter-finals of a 16-man 8-match tournament are paired by drawing. In the case of the Final in the Tokyo Dome it is widely different. The whole event is combined with a ceremony and a press conference. The process looks like a lottery show in the beginning with all the fighters pulling a ball from a glass bowl. The balls represent numbers 1 to 8, which determine the fighters' order in choosing a position from a giant tournament tree figure by standing in front a  drawn bracket (from A to H) on the poster, which represents the fighter's corner-color and the line-number of the match. The next fighter does the same, but he can now choose between challenging the one on the stage or an "empty" section. This procedure goes on until one fighter remains who has no choice but to fill one slot left next to the one lone fighter. This system gives a freedom of choice and tactics to the fighters with the help of a little luck.

K-1 World Grand Prix dates and venues

Champions

See also
 List of K-1 events
 List of PRIDE events
 List of male kickboxers

External links
 K-1 Japan Official website
 K-1 World official website

K-1 events
Sports competitions in Japan
Recurring sporting events established in 1993